"Seeing Blind" is a song recorded by Irish singer and songwriter Niall Horan, featuring guest vocals from American singer Maren Morris. The song is taken from Horan's debut studio album Flicker. It was written by Horan, Ruth-Anne Cunningham and Matthew Smith Radosevich and was produced by Jacquire King. The song was released to the Australian contemporary hit radio on 1 June 2018 as the album's fifth and final single.

Music video
An official acoustic video clip was released on 4 June 2018. Abby Jones from Billboard said "[the] acoustic video sees Horan and Morris in a cozy, homey studio, which serves as the perfect visual backdrop to the country-pop love jam. Horan strums away as he begins the tune, but it's not long before Maren joins him in a blissful harmony that almost sounds better than the original version."

Track listing

Charts

Release history

References

2018 singles
2017 songs
Songs written by Niall Horan
Songs written by RuthAnne
Songs written by Matt Rad
Niall Horan songs
Maren Morris songs